Pierre Rapsat (born Pierre Raepsaet, 28 May 1948 – 20 April 2002) was a Belgian singer-songwriter who had a very successful career in his homeland and also spells of popularity in other Francophone countries. Outside these areas, he is best known for his participation in the 1976 Eurovision Song Contest.

Early life and career 
Rapsat was born in the Ixelles municipality of Brussels to a Flemish father and a mother of Asturian descent. When Rapsat was 10 years old the family moved to Verviers, which remained his home for the rest of his life. He started performing with various groups before launching a solo career in 1973. His musical style was eclectic, ranging from rock to chanson, but at this stage earned him little success.

Eurovision Song Contest 
In 1976 Rapsat's self-composed song "Judy et Cie" ("Judy and Co.") was chosen as the Belgian entry for the twenty first Eurovision Song Contest, which took place on 3 April in The Hague. With its haunting melody and melancholy lyrics, it was an unusual and atypical song for Eurovision at that time. In a strong field, it finished the evening in eighth place out of 18 entries, and is often cited by Eurovision fans as being among Belgium's best.

Later career 
Rapsat's first major success post-Eurovision came in 1982 with the album Lâchez les fauves which sold 30,000 copies in Wallonia. The albums Ligne claire (1984) and J'aime ça (1986) also sold well, and marked Rapsat's first success in the French market. He continued to release albums to critical acclaim in Belgium throughout the 1990s, although during this period his French success abated. It was not until the release of Dazibao in 2001 that he broke out of the Belgian market once again to enjoy widespread success and acclaim in other Francophone countries. Dazibao marked a major comeback for Rapsat in France and was also very popular in Switzerland and Luxembourg.

Death 
In 2001 Rapsat was diagnosed with cancer and was forced to cut down on live appearances while he underwent chemotherapy. He made his final live appearance at a concert in Ath on 1 March 2002. Rapsat died at his home in Verviers on 20 April 2002, aged 53.

Le plus grand Belge 
In 2005 the Belgian television channel RTBF broadcast a show called Le plus grand Belge (The Greatest Belgian) in which viewers were invited to cast their vote by Internet, SMS or telephone. Rapsat was voted into 51st place.

References

1948 births
2002 deaths
Eurovision Song Contest entrants for Belgium
20th-century Belgian male singers
20th-century Belgian singers
Belgian pop singers
Belgian singer-songwriters
Deaths from cancer in Belgium
Eurovision Song Contest entrants of 1976
Musicians from Brussels
Walloon musicians